Meshchovsk is a town and the administrative center of Meshchovsky District in Kaluga Oblast, Russia, located on the Tureya River  southwest of Kaluga, the administrative center of the oblast. Population:

History

It was first mentioned in Russian chronicles in connection with the Mongol invasion of Rus' in 1238. During the Middle Ages it was the patrimony of Princes Mezetsky.

Catherine the Great granted it town rights in 1776.

During World War II, Meshchovsk was occupied by the German Army from October 7, 1941 to January 7, 1942.

Administrative and municipal status
Within the framework of administrative divisions, Meshchovsk serves as the administrative center of Meshchovsky District, to which it is directly subordinated. As a municipal division, the town of Meshchovsk, together with forty-eight rural localities, is incorporated within Meshchovsky Municipal District as Meshchovsk Urban Settlement.

Architecture
Notable buildings include the old (1678–1696) and new (1829–1854) Orthodox cathedrals, both dedicated to the feast of the Annunciation.

Notable people
It was the birthplace in 1846 of Vyacheslav von Plehve, the German-descended  director of the Imperial Russian Police and later Minister of the Interior.

References

Notes

Sources

Cities and towns in Kaluga Oblast
Meshchovsky Uyezd